Judith Lynn Ferguson, aka Judith Ferguson-Foreman, is an American–British author and chef. She is the author of 65 food-related books, mostly focused on North American regional cuisine and microwave cooking.

Ferguson was born in Chicago, and lived in Indiana and then Illinois, she graduated from Indiana University Northwest in Gary, Indiana with a BA in Modern Languages (French & German) and then went on to get a Post Graduate Diploma at Northwestern University, Medill School of Journalism. After University, she went to work for Standard Oil of Indiana. She then gained a place at Le Cordon Bleu in London to study the cookery diploma course. After graduating, she met and married her second husband, an Englishman (Andrew Ferguson), and settled in London. She initially worked for Pru Leith's School of Food & Wine, where she also worked as a cooking instructor. She was then head-hunted back to Le Cordon Bleu in London, where she ran the Diploma Cookery course. She worked for a UK based publishing company called Colour Library Books as a cookbook editor, then joined the UK's Woman's Realm magazine as the cookery editor. She was a contributor to US cookery magazine Gourmet. She wrote a number of cookery books before remarrying her third husband (John Foreman) and returning to the United States, settling initially in North Carolina. In the US, Ferguson worked as a caterer, cookbook author and writer of articles for magazines, and now lives in Alexandria, Virginia. She has now hung up her apron and cooks only for her family.

Bibliography
A Little Chicago Cookbook (2001), 
Cajun Cooking (2000), 
The All-American Cookbook (1997), 
Flavor of New England (1997), 
The Great Fish and Seafood Cookbook (1997), 
The Great Chicken Cookbook (1997), 
The Great Pasta Cookbook (1997), 
Creative Cuisine – Greek Cooking (1995), 
Fish & Seafood (1995), 
Creative Cuisine – Italian Cooking (1995), 
El Gran Libro De LA Cocina Con Microondas, co-author Celia Norman (1995), 
The Great Chicken Cookbook (1995), 
Delicious Desserts  (1994), 
A Little Chicago Cookbook (1994), 
America Cooks : A Culinary Journey from Coast to Coast (1994), 
The Great Pasta Cookbook  (1993),, 
Cajun Cooking (1993), 
New Orleans Cooking : Regional and Ethnic September (1993), 
Snacks & Starters (1993), 
Mexican Cooking (1993), 
The Bread Cookbook (1993), 
The Cookout Cookbook (1993), 
Polish Cooking (1992), 
Amish Country Cooking (1992), 
The Great Fish and Seafood Cookbook (1992), 
Complete Illustrated Step-By-Step Cookbook (1990), 
Italian Cooking (1989), co-authored with David Gibbon, 
America Cooks : A Culinary Journey from Coast to Coast (1989), 
More from Your Microwave (1989), 
Microwave Meat and Poultry (1987), 
Microwave Fish and Seafood (1987), 
Microwave Soups and Appetizers (1987), 
Microwave Cooking for 1 & 2 (1987),  
Microwave Cookbook (1987), 
Fish and Seafood (1987), 
Microwave Chinese Cooking (1987), 
Microwave Baking (1987),

References

Year of birth missing (living people)
Living people
British food writers
American food writers
British non-fiction writers
Alumni of Le Cordon Bleu
Indiana University Northwest alumni
Northwestern University alumni